Matajur is a  mountain in the Julian Alps on the border between Italy and Slovenia. It is located on the border between the Soča Valley and the Italian mountainous region known as Venetian Slovenia, with views over the Adriatic Sea.

Name
Matajur was attested as Mons Regis circa 680, and as in Monte Majori in 1275. The Slovene name Matajur is derived via vowel harmony or akanye from *Motajur (< Mǫtmajur), which was borrowed from a Friulian name that developed from Romance Monte(m) maiōre(m) 'higher mountain'. It is known as Mat'jur in the local dialect, and in Friulian as Mòntmaiôr or Mataiûr (a reborrowing from Slovene). Another old name for this peak is Velika Baba.

History
On 26 October 1917, Oberleutnant Erwin Rommel captured the mountain during the battle of Caporetto of World War I.

See also
 Battle of Caporetto
 Kolovrat Range

References

External links
 Matajur - Hribi.net

Mountains of the Slovene Littoral
Mountains of Friuli-Venezia Giulia
Mountains of the Alps
Italy–Slovenia border
International mountains of Europe
One-thousanders of Italy
One-thousanders of Slovenia